Tan Furen (April 1, 1910 – December 17, 1970) was a lieutenant general in the People's Liberation Army and People's Republic of China politician. Born in Renhua County, Guangdong Province, he was governor of Yunnan Province. A veteran of the Nanchang Uprising and Chinese Civil War, he was shot and killed in Kunming during the Cultural Revolution.

See also 

 Zhao Jianmin Spy Case
 Shadian incident

1910 births
1970 deaths
Chinese Communist Party politicians from Guangdong
Chinese politicians of Hakka descent
Deaths by firearm in China
Delegates to the 7th National Congress of the Chinese Communist Party
Governors of Yunnan
Hakka generals
People's Liberation Army generals from Guangdong
People's Republic of China politicians from Guangdong
Politicians from Shaoguan
Victims of the Cultural Revolution